Ullin as a personal name can refer to:
Ullin, in Germanic paganism, the female counterpart of Ullr in the theorized fertility pair Ullr and Ullin; or referring to the form Ullinn found in placenames
Ullin Place  (1924–2000), British philosopher and psychologist
Albert Ullin (1930–2018), German-Australian bookseller, founder of Australia's first children's bookstore

Ullin as a place name can refer to:
Ullin, Illinois
Glen Ullin, North Dakota
Ullin, Alberta